The 2021 Asia Rugby Sevens Series Trophy also known as the 2021 Asia Rugby Sevens Series qualification or the 2021 West Asia Sevens was the qualification tournament for the 2021 Asia Rugby Sevens Series, the winner of which would qualify for the event as the eighth team. The 2021 Asia Rugby Sevens Series was the first Asian Sevens event to be held since 2019. And was itself a qualification event for the 2022 Rugby World Cup Sevens. 

The tournament was played between five teams (Qatar, United Arab Emirates, Iran, Lebanon and debutants Palestine). The event was held in Doha, Qatar over two days (8th, 9th October). The winners of the tournament were the United Arab Emirates.

Pool stage  
All the tournament results were tallied via Asia Rugby:

Round-robin

Round 1

Round 2

Round 3

Round 4

Round 5

Knockout stage

Playoffs

References

Asian Seven Series
2021 in rugby union